Curtici (Hungarian: Kürtös, German: Kurtitsch) is a town located in Arad County, in western Romania. The town is situated at a  distance from the county capital, Arad, in the western part of Arad County. It is the most important railway meeting point of Central Europe with the western part of Romania. Its administrative territory extends on a  area, on the Sântana Plateau, a plateau characterized in the zone of the town by the sand hills formed by the old branches of the river Mureș.

Curtici is a border town between Hungary and Romania, on the Romanian side. It is an especially important rail border crossing, as it is the main crossing between trains going from Hungary and Romania, especially those between Budapest and Bucharest. The town administered Dorobanți village until 2004, when it was split off to form a separate commune.  The town borders Hungary  and Macea commune to the north, Zimandu Nou commune to the east, Șofronea commune to the south, and Dorobanți commune to the west.

The town's Hungarian name means "Trumpeter"; the German and Romanian names derive from that. The first written confirmation of the town Curtici dates back to the 16th century, specifically to 1519. In 1920, it became part of Romania. It was declared a town in 1968.

Demographics

According to the 2011 census, the population of the town is 6,849 inhabitants. From an ethnic point of view it has the following structure: 86.62% are Romanians, 3.19% Hungarians, 9.35% Roma, 0.11% Germans, 0.21% Ukrainians and 0.1% are of other or undeclared nationalities.

Economy
Its economy is in a continuous development. Due to the agricultural potential of the zone, to its favourable position from the western border of Romania, to its closeness to Arad, to the presence of the main railway making connection with Western Europe (the railway station of Curtici was inaugurated in 1921, simultaneously with the formation of the customs) the town is an important economic pole. The town attracts investments due to the establishment of the Arad-Curtici duty-free zone.

In summer, the thermal water pool is the town's main tourist attraction.

References

Populated places in Arad County
Towns in Romania
Localities in Crișana
Hungary–Romania border crossings